"Ring of Fire" is a song made popular by Johnny Cash when it appeared on his 1963 album Ring of Fire: The Best of Johnny Cash. Written by Cash's eventual second wife June Carter Cash and Merle Kilgore, it was originally recorded as "(Love's) Ring of Fire" by June's sister Anita Carter on her 1963 album Folk Songs Old and New.

Cash's version became one of the biggest hits of his career, staying at No. 1 on the country chart for seven weeks. It was certified gold by the RIAA on January 21, 2010, and has sold over 1.2 million digital downloads. It was named the fourth greatest country song of all time by Country Music Television, while Rolling Stone listed it as the 87th greatest song of all time and the 27th greatest country song of all time.

Conception

Some sources claim that Carter had seen the phrase "Love is like a burning ring of fire" underlined in an Elizabethan poetry book owned by her uncle A. P. Carter. She worked with Kilgore on writing a song inspired by this phrase as she had seen her uncle do in the past. She had written: "There is no way to be in that kind of hell, no way to extinguish a flame that burns, burns, burns".

The song was originally recorded by June's sister, Anita Carter, on her Mercury Records album Folk Songs Old and New (1963) as "(Love's) Ring of Fire". Mercury released Anita's version as a single and it was a featured "pick hit" in Billboard magazine. After hearing Anita's version, Cash claimed he had a dream where he heard the song accompanied by "Mexican horns". The Mariachi horn sound had recently been popularized on American radio with 1962 hit song "The Lonely Bull" by Herb Alpert.  Cash said, "[...] I'll give you about five or six more months, and if you don't hit with it, I'm gonna record it the way I feel it." Cash noted that adding trumpets was a change to his basic sound.

When the song failed to become a major hit for Anita, Cash recorded it his own way, adding the mariachi-style horns from his dream. This sound was later used in the song "It Ain't Me Babe", which was recorded around the same time. Mother Maybelle and the Carter sisters are prominently featured in the Cash recording singing harmony. Cash tinkered with a few of the original phrases in Anita Carter's version of the song. Cash's daughter Rosanne Cash said, "The song is about the transformative power of love and that's what it has always meant to me and that's what it will always mean to the Cash children."

In 2004, Merle Kilgore, who shared writing credit for the song with June Carter, proposed licensing the song for a hemorrhoid cream commercial. When performing the song live, Kilgore would often "mock dedicate" the song to the "makers of Preparation H". However, June's heirs were not of a like mind, and they refused to allow the song to be licensed for the ad.

Cash's first wife Vivian Cash (Liberto) states in her autobiography: "One day in early 1963, while gardening in the yard, Johnny told me about a song he had just written with Merle Kilgore and Curly while out fishing on Lake Casitas. 'I’m gonna give June half credit on a song I just wrote,' Johnny said. 'It’s called "Ring of Fire."' 'Why?' I asked, wiping dirt from my hands. The mere mention of her name annoyed me. I was sick of hearing about her. 'She needs the money,' he said, avoiding my stare. 'And I feel sorry for her.' Vivian Cash also states: "To this day, it confounds me to hear the elaborate details June told of writing that song for Johnny. She didn’t write that song any more than I did. The truth is, Johnny wrote that song, while pilled up and drunk, about a certain private female body part. All those years of her claiming she wrote it herself, and she probably never knew what the song was really about."

Chart performance

Johnny Cash version

Eric Burdon and the Animals version

Sandy Kelly & Johnny Cash version

Social Distortion version

Alan Jackson version

Certifications

Legacy
Numerous cover versions of "Ring of Fire" have been produced, the most commercially successful version being by Eric Burdon & the Animals. Their version was recorded at the end of 1968, and made the top 40 in four countries. In late 1974, the Eric Burdon Band released a hard rock version. Wall of Voodoo debuted with a cover of the song on their self-titled 1980 EP and featured a pulsing synthesizer. Dwight Yoakam covered it on his debut album Guitars, Cadillacs, Etc., Etc. Punk rock band Social Distortion covered it on their 1990 self-titled LP. In 1991, Frank Zappa released a reggae-style live version on the album The Best Band You Never Heard in Your Life, after claiming to have met Johnny Cash in the elevator before the show and inviting him to perform the song with his band that night.  Cash did not follow through on the invitation, but the band played the song anyway. A cover of the song by Alan Jackson with guest vocals from Lee Ann Womack was released as a single on December 6, 2010. It served as the lead-off single to his 34 Number Ones compilation album, and peaked at #45 in the Hot Country Songs, becoming his first single to miss the top 40 since "Just Put a Ribbon in Your Hair" peaked at #51 in 2004. It was his last single released by Arista Records. The ska band Swim Herschel Swim covered the song on their album Burn Swim Burn. The English power metal band DragonForce recorded a cover as the closing track to the standard edition of their 2014 album, Maximum Overload.

Cash's version of "Ring of Fire" was never released as a single in the UK. However, in 1993 and 1994, it gained significant radio airplay in the UK after it was used in a popular television commercial for Levi's. In 2005, Liverpool FC fans began singing the song at matches during the run-up to that year's Champions League Final, and it has been a staple song for the team's fans ever since.

Wall of Voodoo's cover version was featured in the 1981 avant-garde pornographic film Nightdreams.

Since 2004, the Calgary Flames of the NHL have used the song as a victory song after every home win.

References

External links
 
 
 

1963 songs
1963 singles
1990 singles
1969 singles
2010 singles
2014 singles
Songs written by Merle Kilgore
Johnny Cash songs
Dwight Yoakam songs
Mark Collie songs
George Canyon songs
Alan Jackson songs
The Animals songs
Social Distortion songs
Grammy Hall of Fame Award recipients
Columbia Nashville Records singles
MGM Records singles
Epic Records singles
Sony Music singles
Mercury Nashville singles
Arista Nashville singles
Songs written by June Carter Cash
Song recordings produced by Don Law